Mallig Plains Region is a region in the western part of the province of Isabela in the Philippines. Its name was acquired from the rolling terrains in western Isabela. The municipality of Roxas serves as the region's business hub.

Component local government units 

Mallig Plains Region, just like Metro Manila and Metro Cebu, is not an administrative political unit but an agglomeration of independent local government units (LGUs), the third level government in the Philippine political system.

Based on data from the 2015 census

History
In 1929, the late President Manuel L. Quezon declared the westernmost part of Isabela as a resettlement area, historically known as the Mallig Plains Resettlement Area. The area was named after the Mallig River that traverses it. It includes the municipalities of Gamu, Quezon and some parts of past day Tumauini and Ilagan City. Quezon have long been seats of rich and colorful historical events that influenced the lives of the people of Isabela since its creation on May 1, 1856 through a Royal Decree issued in honor of Queen Isabella II of Spain (reigned 1843 to 1868). A Barrio Dalig of Gamu was created as an independent municipality named Aurora on 1927 and is referred as the Gateway to Mallig Plains. On 1948 President Elpidio Quirino signed Executive Order 136 creating the "Barrio Vira" of Gamu as an independent municipality named Roxas. In 1957, some baranggays of Roxas were separated to form the newly created municipality of Callang (now San Manuel).

From then on, the influx of settlers from the Central Luzon and the Ilocos Region encouraged more other settlers to migrate westward in these Kalinga-dominated plains.

On 1970s, the municipality of Mallig serves as the most progressive among the municipalities of Mallig Plains. But on 1980s, the municipality of Aurora overcame Mallig and became the business center. However, on 1990s to present, Roxas officially overcame the two municipalities and is now the business center of the Mallig Plains.

Geographical location
The Mallig Plains Region is composed of 1,199 km2 with a total population of 205, 813 with Roxas as the most populated and the only 1st class municipality among seven. It is a lowland area with rolling terrain and kilometers of straight National Highway. The region is bordered by Paracelis, Mountain Province and Tabuk City on the west, Cabagan and Santo Tomas, Isabela on the north, Tumauini, Delfin Albano and Gamu, Isabela on the east, and Cabatuan, San Mateo and Reina Mercedes, Isabela on the south.

Government

Unlike Metro Manila or other settlement areas, Mallig Plains Region doesn't have a government that directly administers the settlement area. The government is still independent each municipality.

References

Geography of Isabela (province)
Landforms of Isabela (province)
Plains of the Philippines